Katha Sangama is a 1976 Indian Kannada-language anthology film, directed by Puttanna Kanagal, based on three short stories; Hangu by Giraddi Govindaraj, Athithi by Veena and Munithaayi by Eshwara Chandra. The film stars Kalyan Kumar, Rajinikanth, B. Saroja Devi and Aarathi in the lead roles. The supporting cast includes Lokanath, Vamana Rao, Shivaramaiah and Master Umesh. The film won three awards at the 1975–76 Karnataka State Film Awards, including the award for Best Actress (Aarathi).

The 1984 Tamil film Kai Kodukkum Kai was an extended version of the  Munithayi segment from this movie. Rajnikanth, who played the antagonist role in the Kannada movie, played the lead role in the Tamil version. The antagonist role of the Kannada movie was also an inspiration for Rajanikanth's characterization in the 1977 Tamil movie 16 Vayathinile directed by debutant Bharathiraja who was an associate of Puttanna Kanagal.

Cast
B. Saroja Devi
Aarathi
Rajinikanth
Kalyan Kumar
Leelavathi

Hangu
The movie is based on a short story by the Kannada writer Giraddi Govindaraj. It is about a poor university professor with high moral values and integrity who is offered a bribe from a wealthy contractor to push some grace marks to his son in his exam paper so that he could get enough percentage to qualify for a medical college. This happens just when the professor's young son is critically ill and requires expensive medical treatment. Whether the professor succumbs to the circumstances or he let go of his integrity forms the crux of the story.

Atithi
It tells the story of a middle-aged woman who is the warden of a girls hostel. When younger she had refused to marry the man who loved her because of her ideals about feminism. She had even decided to say unmarried her entire life. A chance encounter with the man, now happily married to someone else, makes her question her earlier decision of not accepting true love.

Munithaayi
It has a story of wealthy man marrying a blind girl (Aarathi) out of pity, but in his absence she is raped by an adolescent youth and later blackmailed. The husband eventually "forgives" her. Aarathi plays the role of the blind girl and Rajinikanth plays a small role as the man who rapes her. Rajinikanth's characterisation in this movie went on to be used in the 1977 movie 16 Vayathinile.

The 1984 Tamil movie Kai Kodukkum Kai was based on this segment and was an extended version of the Munithaayi story.

Awards
 Karnataka State Film Awards 1975–76
 Fourth Best Film
 Best Actress – Aarathi
 Best Supporting Actor – Master Umesh

References

External links 
 

1976 films
1970s Kannada-language films
Films directed by Puttanna Kanagal
Indian black-and-white films
Films scored by Vijaya Bhaskar
Kannada films remade in other languages